The ABC Under-18 Championship for Women 2002 is the 16th edition of the ABC's junior championship for basketball. The games were held at Taipei from December 21–30, 2002.

Preliminary round

Group A

Group B

Classification 5th–10th

9th place

7th place

5th place

Final round

Semifinals

3rd place

Final

Final standing

Awards

See also
 List of sporting events in Taiwan

External links
JABBA

2002
2002 in women's basketball
2002–03 in Asian basketball
2002–03 in Taiwanese basketball
International women's basketball competitions hosted by Taiwan
2002 in youth sport